Martinsburg is a city in Audrain County, Missouri, United States. The population was 304 at the 2010 census.

History
Martinsburg was founded in 1857 and was named after its founder, William R. Martin.

Geography
Martinsburg is located at  (39.101182, -91.647355).

Demographics

2010 census
As of the census of 2010, there were 304 people, 137 households, and 87 families living in the city. The racial makeup of the city was 98.0% White, 1.0% African American, 0.3% Asian, 0.3% from other races, and 0.3% from two or more races. Hispanic or Latino of any race were 1.3% of the population.

There were 137 households, of which 29.9% had children under the age of 18 living with them, 52.6% were married couples living together, 5.8% had a female householder with no husband present, 5.1% had a male householder with no wife present, and 36.5% were non-families. 32.8% of all households were made up of individuals, and 13.9% had someone living alone who was 65 years of age or older. The average household size was 2.22 and the average family size was 2.79.

The median age in the city was 43.3 years. 23% of residents were under the age of 18; 5.9% were between the ages of 18 and 24; 22.4% were from 25 to 44; 24.3% were from 45 to 64; and 24.3% were 65 years of age or older. The gender makeup of the city was 52.0% male and 48.0% female.

2000 census
As of the census of 2000, there were 326 people, 134 households, and 97 families living in the town. The population density was 1,255.3 people per square mile (484.1/km2). There were 148 housing units at an average density of 569.9 per square mile (219.8/km2). The racial makeup of the town was 98.16% White, 0.61% African American, and 1.23% from two or more races. Hispanic or Latino of any race were 0.61% of the population.
 
There were 134 households, out of which 34.3% had children under the age of 18 living with them, 61.2% were married couples living together, 6.7% had a female householder with no husband present, and 26.9% were non-families. 22.4% of all households were made up of individuals, and 11.9% had someone living alone who was 65 years of age or older. The average household size was 2.43 and the average family size was 2.86.

In the town the population was spread out, with 25.8% under the age of 18, 7.4% from 18 to 24, 29.4% from 25 to 44, 21.5% from 45 to 64, and 16.0% who were 65 years of age or older. The median age was 38 years. For every 100 females, there were 107.6 males. For every 100 females age 18 and over, there were 112.3 males.

The median income for a household in the town was $31,442, and the median income for a family was $33,125. Males had a median income of $22,917 versus $23,438 for females. The per capita income for the town was $17,562. About 6.6% of families and 4.6% of the population were below the poverty line, including 3.4% of those under age 18 and 4.5% of those age 65 or over.

Education
St Joseph Elementary School in Martinsburg is a private, Roman Catholic institution.

Martinsburg has a lending library, a branch of the Mexico-Audrain Library District.

Notable person
Adolph John Paschang, Roman Catholic bishop

References

Cities in Audrain County, Missouri
Cities in Missouri
Columbia metropolitan area (Missouri)